The Watson-Sawyer House is a historic house at 502 E. Parker St. in Hamburg, Arkansas.  It was built in 1870 by E.D. Watson, an early settler of Ashley County, and is one of the finest houses in the county.  The two-story house was built entirely out of oak, and features a two-story pedimented front portico supported by fluted Doric columns.  The pediment is decorated with ribbon-like woodwork, which is repeated on the gable ends of main roof.  Each floor on the front facade has a centrally-located door with sidelights, flanked by pairs of windows.

The house was listed on the National Register of Historic Places in 1975.  It continues to be held by Watson's descendants.

See also
National Register of Historic Places listings in Ashley County, Arkansas

References

Houses on the National Register of Historic Places in Arkansas
Houses completed in 1870
Houses in Ashley County, Arkansas
National Register of Historic Places in Ashley County, Arkansas
1870 establishments in Arkansas
Hamburg, Arkansas